Justice N. D. Krishna Rao (19 July 1904 – 21 February 1971) was Chief Justice of Andhra Pradesh High Court.

He was born on 19 July 1904. He was educated at Elementary School, Manjeshwar, Christian High School, Udipi, Ganapathy Secondary School, Mangalore, Government College, Mangalore Presidency College, Madras, School of Economics London and Brasenose College, Oxford. He has joined the Indian Civil Service on 28 September 1928. He has served in Madras State till the formation of Andhra State, as Assistant and Sub-collector from 22 November 1928 to 18 July 1935. He was District Munsif from 19 July 1935 to 18 January 1937. District Judge and Sub-collector from 23 January 1937 to 13 June 1937; District Judge and Collector from 14 June 1937 to 20 October 1940. He was District Judge from 31 October 1940 to 20 February 1955. He was confirmed as District Judge, Grade-II on 18 June 1941 and as District Judge, Grade-I from May 1952.

He was appointed Judge of Andhra High Court on 21 February 1955. He was appointed Chief Justice of Andhra Pradesh High Court on 8 July 1966 and retired on 19 July 1966. He died on 21 February 1971.

External links
 Profile of N. D. Krishna Rao at Andhra Pradesh High Court website.

Indian civil servants
1904 births
1971 deaths
Alumni of Brasenose College, Oxford
Chief Justices of the Andhra Pradesh High Court
20th-century Indian judges